Mikko Jaskari (5 January 1866, Nurmo - 10 October 1936) was a Finnish farmer, lay preacher and politician. He was a member of the Parliament of Finland, representing the Finnish Party from 1913 to 1916 and the National Coalition Party from 1920 to 1927.

References

1866 births
1936 deaths
People from Seinäjoki
People from Vaasa Province (Grand Duchy of Finland)
Finnish Lutherans
Finnish Party politicians
National Coalition Party politicians
Members of the Parliament of Finland (1913–16)
Members of the Parliament of Finland (1919–22)
Members of the Parliament of Finland (1922–24)
Members of the Parliament of Finland (1924–27)